The Javan myna (Acridotheres javanicus), also known as the white-vented myna, is a species of myna. It is a member of the starling family. It is native to Bali and Java. It has been introduced to other Asian countries, and as far away as Puerto Rico.

Taxonomy
The Javan myna is sometimes included in the great myna (Acridotheres grandis) or the jungle myna (A. fuscus). The International Ornithologists' Union recommends not using the name "white-vented myna" to avoid confusion.

Description
The Javan myna is mainly black. The wings are brownish-black, and the primaries have white bases. The undertail-coverts are white. There is a short crest on the forehead.Its beak, legs and feet are yellow. The eyes are lemon-yellow. The immature is browner.

Habitat
The Javan myna is native to Bali and Java, and has been introduced to southeastern Thailand, southern Malaysia, Singapore, Sumatra, the Lesser Sundas, Taiwan, Puerto Rico, Japan and Nepal. It is found in cities and cultivated areas.

Behaviour
The Javan myna is omnivorous and eats seeds, fruit, nectar, insects and human waste. It is often found in large groups. Its voice is similar to that of the common myna. It builds its nest in holes. The eggs are bluish-glaucous. Javan mynas are bold and not very afraid of humans. Javan mynas are kept in cages in Malaysia and Indonesia. The birds scavenge in groups, minimum two but usually three or more, with all except one feeding and one usually at a vantage point keeping a look out. If the bird that is keeping watch sees anything that might pose a threat, it alarms the group members with a high pitch tweet and they all flee the area swiftly. If one of them is separated, they would tend to tweet to attract other mynas of their kind to come over.

References 

Acridotheres
Birds described in 1850
Taxa named by Jean Cabanis
Birds of Java
Birds of Malaysia
Birds of Singapore
Articles containing video clips